Chuang Chia-jung and Květa Peschke were the defending champions after they defeated Chan Yung-jan and Monica Niculescu in the 2010 final. However, they chose to not participate this year.
3rd seeds Sara Errani and Roberta Vinci won in the final 6–3, 7–5, against Kateryna Bondarenko and Līga Dekmeijere.

Seeds

  Bethanie Mattek-Sands /  Meghann Shaughnessy (quarterfinals, withdrew due to Mattek-Sands' participating in the singles final match)
  Olga Govortsova /  Alla Kudryavtseva (first round)
  Sara Errani /  Roberta Vinci (champions) 
  Natalie Grandin /  Vladimíra Uhlířová (quarterfinals)

Draw

Draw

References
 Main Draw

Doubles 2011
Hobart International – Doubles